Dandoski (also Romanized as Dandoskī; also known as Dandūskī) is a village in Kuhestan Rural District, Jazmurian District, Rudbar-e Jonubi County, Kerman Province, Iran. At the 2006 census, its population was 169, in 36 families.

References 

Populated places in Rudbar-e Jonubi County